Essar Shipping Ltd., now Essar Shipping Ports & Logistics Limited, is an Indian shipping corporation for the global energy business. Founded in 1945, the company was incorporated in 2010. The company is listed in Bombay Stock Exchange . The company headquarters is located in Mumbai. The company is a part of Essar Group.

The company's fleet handles a daily average of eight million barrels of crude oil, 320,000 barrels of petroleum products and 355,000 tons of dry bulk cargo. The company currently has a fleet of 26 vessels, with an additional 12 new ships on order. It provides contract drilling services to global oil majors, with a fleet of 13 onshore rigs and one semi-submersible offshore rig; two new jack-up rigs on order.  Essar Shipping Ports & Logistics Ltd was the first Indian shipping company to obtain the International Safety Management Code (ISM) in 1995 and is also ISO 14001 certified.. The company has proposed to maximise the fleet in 2017-18 by adding new VLCCs & ULCCs.

Operations

Sea transportation 
Company has a diversified fleet of 26 vessels including VLCCs, Capesize, Mini-capesize, Supramaxes, mini-bulk carriers and tugs. It provides crude oil and petroleum products transportation, transportation management services and integrated dry bulk transportation services. It has provided service for more than 220 ship years to Indian and global oil majorsand commodity traders.
 Provides crude oil and product transportation services                    
 More than 225 ship years of service to leading Indian and global oil majors and commodity traders; tonnage presently stands at 2 million tonnes

Ports and terminals
Vadinar (Gujarat, India): A 37 million ton port and terminal facility to provide handling, storage and terminaling services for crude oil and petroleum products to refineries and traders.

Logistics
It provides end-to-end logistics services – from ships to ports, lighterage services to plants, intra-plant logistics and dispatching finished products to the final customer. It owns transhipment assets to provide lighterage support services, onshore & offshore logistics services. Essar Shipping manages a fleet of 4,200 trucks for inland transportation of steel and petroleum products.
 Essar Shipping owns transhipment assets to provide lighterage support services, onshore & offshore logistics services
 Essar Shipping manages a fleet of 4,200 trucks for inland transportation of steel and petroleum product

Oilfields services ( OGDSL - Oil & Gas Drilling Services Limited)
Essar Shipping provides contract drilling and Integrated Project Management services to oil and gas companies worldwide, operating both offshore and onshore in a multitude of countries.
 Owns a fleet of 14 rigs, which includes 1 semi-submersible rig and 13 onshore rigs

Under execution
 Sea transportation: On order book of 4 new building vessels
 Oilfields services: New On shore drilling contract in Gabon to begin shortly. Beating its own records of highest commercial speed with new added Schramm Rigs deployed with ONGC CBM

See also
 Essar Group
 Shipping Corporation of India

References

 The Hindu, Sunday, Oct 03, 2004 -  Essar Shipping: Buy, by S. Vaidya Nathan
 CorporateInformation Snapshot of Essar Shipping Limited
 
 

Merchant ships of India
Shipping companies of India
Essar Group
Companies based in Mumbai
Transport companies established in 1945
Indian companies established in 1945
Companies listed on the National Stock Exchange of India
Companies listed on the Bombay Stock Exchange